The Unloved is a British television film starring Molly Windsor, Robert Carlyle, Susan Lynch and Lauren Socha. It is about an eleven-year-old girl called Lucy (Windsor) growing up in a children's home in the UK's care system, and shown through her perspective. It is the directorial debut of Golden Globe Award-winning and two-time Academy Award-nominated actress Samantha Morton. The story is semi-autobiographical, Morton wrote and produced the film in collaboration with screenwriter Tony Grisoni.

It was produced for Channel 4 and shown as part of its Britain's Forgotten Children series, and was first broadcast on 17 May 2009. The film drew an audience of two million viewers. It had a premiere at the 2009 Toronto International Film Festival and received a limited release in 2010.

Cast
 Molly Windsor – Lucy
 Susan Lynch – Mother
 Robert Carlyle – Father
 Lauren Socha – Lauren
 Craig Parkinson – Ben
 Andrea Lowe – Vicky
 Kerry Stacey – Social worker
 Michael Socha – Michael
 Katie Withers – Jules

Production
Filmed entirely on location in Morton's hometown of Nottingham, the film cost £1.5 million to make.
The title of the film was inspired by a newspaper article Morton had read about children in the foster care system. Morton spent time in other cities such as Newcastle, Glasgow and around London although decided it was best to make a film about the world she knew and grew up in. Originally wanting to set the film in 1989, Morton later decided against it as she wanted to focus on the struggles of the present day and not want audiences to write it off as a historical piece.

Awards
The film won Robert Carlyle a Scottish BAFTA for best TV actor in November 2009.
On 10 May 2010 it was announced that the film had been nominated for 'Best Single Drama'; Lauren Socha was nominated for a BAFTA for Best Actress in a Supporting Role.
On 6 June 2010, The Unloved won the BAFTA for Best Single Drama.

Critical reception
The Telegraph's Michael Deacon gave the film a positive review describing it as "Riveting" and "Powerful from start to finish"; On the other hand, he stated the film was "Stomach churning" and "Hard to watch"; however to his surprise he could not take his eyes off the film and praised Morton on creating an "Intense" and "Vivid" dramatic film.

Home media
As of May 2011, the show is available on DVD from Oscilloscope.

References

External links

 

2009 films
2009 television films
British television films
Channel 4 original programming
Foster care in the United Kingdom
Films about child abuse
2009 directorial debut films
2000s English-language films